Brafferton could be

Brafferton, County Durham, England
Brafferton, North Yorkshire, England
Brafferton (building), part of Ancient Campus at the College of William and Mary, Williamsburg, Virginia